Piotr Prędota (born 20 July 1982) is a Polish retired footballer who played as a forward.

External links
 

1982 births
Living people
Polish footballers
Pogoń Szczecin players
Piast Gliwice players
Górnik Łęczna players
Stal Rzeszów players
Motor Lublin players
Radomiak Radom players
Avia Świdnik players
Ekstraklasa players
I liga players
II liga players
III liga players
Sportspeople from Lublin
Association football forwards